Sir James Butler of Polestown (died 1487) was a warlord in Yorkist Ireland.

Career
James was the eldest son of Sir Edmund MacRichard Butler, whom he succeeded in 1464 as Lord Deputy of Ireland over his absentee cousins John and Thomas, the 6th and 7th Earls of Ormond, respectively. As was his family's tradition, he had a long career as a Gaelic warlord which included raiding and rustling across southern Leinster. He sided with the House of Lancaster against King Edward IV of England, for which he was attainted; but when that King was settled on the throne, he overlooked this mistake in his conduct, and an Act of Parliament passed in Ireland, repealed all attainders, judgments, and outlawries, against him. The King, in consideration of his faithful services from that time, granted him, in April 1468 (among other things) the manor and advowson (right to nominate the parish priest) of Callan for life. And on 12 October 1477, he was constituted by John, Earl of Ormond, his attorney and deputy, to manage his lands in Ireland. In this way he ordered the reform of the town of Carrick-on-Suir. He was knighted, and built the castle of Neigham (Nehorn old name) near Gowran.

Death
He died on 16 April 1487 and was buried in Callan Augustinian Friary, of which he was the founder.

Marriage and Children
Around 1450 he began a love affair with Sabh Kavanagh. Her parents were Donal Reagh MacMurrough-Kavanagh (a.k.a. Domhnall mac Gerald MacMurrough-Kavanagh), King of Leinster and an unknown daughter of an O'Nolan chieftain. Three children were born before James and Sabh were married. James later arranged for the Irish Parliament to declare them legitimate.

 Edmund Butler of Polestown
 Theobald Butler of Polestown
 John FitzJames Butler of Polestown whose only daughter and heir, Margaret, was married to Edmond Blanchville of Blanchvillestown, county Kilkenny.
 Alice Butler (or Ellice) the first wife of Sir George Fleming of Stephenstown, second son of James Fleming, 7th Baron Slane: she was mother of James, who by his wife Ismay, daughter of the Lord Chief Justice of Ireland, Sir Bartholomew Dillon of Riverstown, was the father of Thomas Fleming, 10th Baron Slane.
 Margaret, who married as his second wife Sir Alexander Plunket, Lord Chancellor of Ireland, and had issue.
 Piers Butler, 8th Earl of Ormond and 1st Earl of Ossory (1467-1539), also known as (Irish Piers Ruadh) Red Piers.

See also
 Butler dynasty

References

Ormond, Duke of, Life 1610-'88: Thomas A. Carte, M.A. 6 vols. Oxford, 1851

1487 deaths
James
15th-century Irish people
People of the Tudor period
Year of birth missing